Amine gas treating, also known as amine scrubbing, gas sweetening and acid gas removal, refers to a group of processes that use aqueous solutions of various alkylamines (commonly referred to simply as amines) to remove hydrogen sulfide (H2S) and carbon dioxide (CO2) from gases.   It is a common unit process used in refineries, and is also used in petrochemical plants, natural gas processing plants and other industries.

Processes within oil refineries or chemical processing plants that remove hydrogen sulfide are referred to as "sweetening" processes because the odor of the processed products is improved by the absence of hydrogen sulfide.  An alternative to the use of amines involves membrane technology. However, membrane separation is less attractive due to the relatively high capital and operating costs as well as other technical factors.

Many different amines are used in gas treating:
 Diethanolamine (DEA)
 Monoethanolamine (MEA)
 Methyldiethanolamine (MDEA)
 Diisopropanolamine (DIPA)
 Aminoethoxyethanol (Diglycolamine) (DGA)

The most commonly used amines in industrial plants are the alkanolamines DEA, MEA, and MDEA.  These amines are also used in many oil refineries to remove sour gases from liquid hydrocarbons such as liquified petroleum gas (LPG).

Description of a typical amine treater 

The chemistry involved in the amine treating of such gases varies somewhat with the particular amine being used. For one of the more common amines, monoethanolamine (MEA) denoted as RNH2, the acid-base reaction involving the protonation of the amine electron pair to form a positively charged ammonium group (RNH) can be expressed as:

RNH2 +   RNH + HS−
RNH2 +   RNH + 

The resulting dissociated and ionized species being more soluble in solution are trapped, or scrubbed, by the amine solution and so easily removed from the gas phase.

A typical amine gas treating process (the Girbotol process, as shown in the flow diagram below) includes an absorber unit and a regenerator unit as well as accessory equipment. The resultant "rich" amine is then routed into the regenerator (a stripper with a reboiler) to produce regenerated or "lean" amine that is recycled for reuse in the absorber.

Alternative processes
Alternative stripper configurations include matrix, internal exchange, flashing feed, and multipressure with split feed. Many of these configurations offer more energy efficiency for specific solvents or operating conditions. Vacuum operation favors solvents with low heats of absorption while operation at normal pressure favors solvents with high heats of absorption. Solvents with high heats of absorption require less energy for stripping from temperature swing at fixed capacity. Energy and costs are reduced since the reboiler duty cycle is slightly less than normal pressure stripper. The multipressure configuration with split feed reduces the flow into the bottom section, which also reduces the equivalent work. The multipressure configuration is more attractive for solvents with a higher heats of absorption.

Amines 

The amine concentration in the absorbent aqueous solution is an important parameter in the design and operation of an amine gas treating process. Depending on which one of the following four amines the unit was designed to use and what gases it was designed to remove, these are some typical amine concentrations, expressed as weight percent of pure amine in the aqueous solution:

 Monoethanolamine: About 20 % for removing H2S and CO2, and about 32 % for removing only CO2.
 Diethanolamine: About 20 to 25 % for removing H2S and CO2
 Methyldiethanolamine: About 30 to 55 % for removing H2S and CO2
 Diglycolamine: About 50 % for removing H2S and CO2

The choice of amine concentration in the circulating aqueous solution depends upon a number of factors and may be quite arbitrary. It is usually made simply on the basis of experience. The factors involved include whether the amine unit is treating raw natural gas or petroleum refinery by-product gases that contain relatively low concentrations of both H2S and CO2 or whether the unit is treating gases with a high percentage of CO2 such as the offgas from the steam reforming process used in ammonia production or the flue gases from power plants.

Both H2S and CO2 are acid gases and hence corrosive to carbon steel. However, in an amine treating unit, CO2 is the stronger acid of the two. H2S forms a film of iron sulfide on the surface of the steel that acts to protect the steel. When treating gases with a high percentage of CO2, corrosion inhibitors are often used and that permits the use of higher concentrations of amine in the circulating solution.

Another factor involved in choosing an amine concentration is the relative solubility of H2S and CO2 in the selected amine. The choice of the type of amine will affect the required circulation rate of amine solution, the energy consumption for the regeneration and the ability to selectively remove either H2S alone or CO2 alone if desired. For more information about selecting the amine concentration, the reader is referred to Kohl and Nielsen's book.

MEA and DEA
MEA and DEA are primary and secondary amines. They are very reactive and can effectively remove a high volume of gas due to a high reaction rate. However, due to stoichiometry, the loading capacity is limited to 0.5 mol CO2 per mole of amine.  MEA and DEA also require a large amount of energy to strip the CO2 during regeneration, which can be up to 70% of total operating costs. They are also more corrosive and chemically unstable compared to other amines.

Uses 
In oil refineries, that stripped gas is mostly H2S, much of which often comes from a sulfur-removing process called hydrodesulfurization.  This H2S-rich stripped gas stream is then usually routed into a Claus process to convert it into elemental sulfur. In fact, the vast majority of the 64,000,000 metric tons of sulfur produced worldwide in 2005 was byproduct sulfur from refineries and other hydrocarbon processing plants. Another sulfur-removing process is the WSA Process which recovers sulfur in any form as concentrated sulfuric acid. In some plants, more than one amine absorber unit may share a common regenerator unit. 
The current emphasis on removing CO2 from the flue gases emitted by fossil fuel power plants has led to much interest in using amines for removing CO2 (see also: carbon capture and storage and conventional coal-fired power plant).

In the specific case of the industrial synthesis of ammonia, for the steam reforming process of hydrocarbons to produce gaseous hydrogen, amine treating is one of the commonly used processes for removing excess carbon dioxide in the final purification of the gaseous hydrogen.

In the biogas production it is sometimes necessary to remove carbon dioxide from the biogas to make it comparable with natural gas. The removal of the sometimes high content of hydrogen sulfide is necessary to prevent corrosion of metallic parts after burning the bio gas.

Carbon capture and storage 
Amines are used to remove CO2 in various areas ranging from natural gas production to the food and beverage industry, and have been for over sixty years.

There are multiple classifications of amines, each of which has different characteristics relevant to CO2 capture. For example, monoethanolamine (MEA) reacts strongly with acid gases like CO2 and has a fast reaction time and an ability to remove high percentages of CO2, even at the low CO2 concentrations. Typically, monoethanolamine (MEA) can capture 85% to 90% of the CO2 from the flue gas of a coal-fired plant, which is one of the most effective solvent to capture CO2.

Challenges of carbon capture using amine include:
 Low pressure gas increases difficulty of transferring CO2 from the gas into amine
 Oxygen content of the gas can cause amine degradation and acid formation 
 CO2 degradation of primary (and secondary) amines 
 High energy consumption 
 Very large facilities 
 Finding a suitable location (enhanced oil recovery, deep saline aquifers, basaltic rocks...) to dispose of the removed CO2

The partial pressure is the driving force to transfer CO2 into the liquid phase. Under the low pressure, this transfer is hard to achieve without increasing the reboiler’s heat duty, which will result in higher cost.

Primary and secondary amines, for example, MEA and DEA, will react with CO2 and form degradation products. O2 from the inlet gas will cause degradation as well. The degraded amine is no longer able to capture CO2, which decreases the overall carbon capture efficiency.

Currently, variety of amine mixtures are being synthesized and tested to achieve a more desirable set of overall properties for use in CO2 capture systems. One major focus is on lowering the energy required for solvent regeneration, which has a major impact on process costs. However, there are tradeoffs to consider. For example, the energy required for regeneration is typically related to the driving forces for achieving high capture capacities. Thus, reducing the regeneration energy can lower the driving force and thereby increase the amount of solvent and size of absorber needed to capture a given amount of CO2, thus, increasing the capital cost.

See also

Ammonia production
Hydrodesulfurization
WSA Process
Claus process
Selexol
Rectisol
Amine
Ionic liquids in carbon capture
Solid sorbents for carbon capture

References

External links
 Description of Gas Sweetening Equipment and Operating Conditions
 Selecting Amines for Sweetening Units, Polasek, J. (Bryan Research & Engineering) and Bullin, J.A. (Texas A&M University), Gas Processors Association Regional Meeting, Sept. 1994.
 Natural Gas Supply Association Scroll down to Sulfur and Carbon Dioxide Removal
  Description of the classic book on gas treating  by 

Acid gas control
Biogas technology
Carbon capture and storage
Chemical processes
Gas technologies
Natural gas technology
Oil refining